Rakownia  is a village in the administrative district of Gmina Murowana Goślina, within Poznań County, Greater Poland Voivodeship, in west-central Poland. It is situated on the road from Murowana Goślina to Kamińsko, at the edge of the Puszcza Zielonka forest and landscape park.

References

Rakownia